Istrup is one of 19 villages belonging to the city of Blomberg, North Rhine-Westphalia. It is about 4 km away from Blomberg and has a population of about 1600, making it the second-largest village in  Blomberg.

Infrastructure 
Istrup is located along the B252, a regional north-south highway. Locally available services include two churches, a graveyard, a gas station, a bakery, a fast-food place, and a sports ground.

References 

Villages in North Rhine-Westphalia
Principality of Lippe